Ace Radio Broadcasters is an Australian media company. Formed in 1984, it operates 21 commercial radio stations in Victoria and southern New South Wales, as well as the digital marketing agency Ace Digital and The Weekly Advertiser, a free newspaper distributed across the Wimmera region.

History
Ace Radio Broadcasters was founded in 1984, following the acquisition of radio station 3HA in Hamilton, Victoria by Associated Communication Enterprises, owners of the Melbourne newspaper Truth. The group acquired 3CS Colac in 1985 and, by 1986, had control of 3SH Swan Hill and 3WM Horsham. As of 1994, the company was in the joint control of Geoff and Helen Handbury and Rowly and Judy Paterson, and had additional interests in radio stations in Wollongong, Shepparton and Geelong.

The company continued to expand in the late 1990s and into the 2000s. Divesting itself of 3SR and Sun FM Shepparton and Bay FM Geelong, in 1995 the company acquired 3TR Traralgon and 3YB Warrnambool. In 1996, Ace Radio commenced the roll-out of FM radio in its markets, launching Mixx FM branded stations in Horsham, Swan Hill and Colac, with Mixx FM Hamilton and Coast FM Warrnambool launching in 2002. Also in 2002, 3TR converted to the FM band as TRFM, with 3GV launched on the former AM frequency.

In September 2005, Ace Radio purchased 2AY from Macquarie Regional RadioWorks, which the latter was forced to divest following its acquisition of DMG Regional Radio.

In June 2016, Ace Radio's stations were added to the iHeartRadio platform in Australia, with the iHeartRadio Thumbs Up Countdown launched across the network's six 'Hit Music' FM stations.

In August 2017, it was announced that Ace Radio would acquire 2QN and Edge FM Deniliquin, New South Wales from Rich Rivers Radio, and 3NE and Edge FM Wangaratta from North East Broadcasters.

In June 2018, Ace Radio ceased operation of the Radio Training Institute. Launched in 1984 as the Melbourne Radio School, the institute had been operated by Ace in South Melbourne since 2003.

From 14 January 2022, Ace Radio took over the operations of three metropolitan stations from Nine Entertainment, under a lease arrangement.

Radio stations
, Ace Radio Broadcasters operates 21 radio stations. 

Nine of these stations form their 'Heritage' network, featuring local news, music and syndicated talkback programming targeted at a 40+ audience:
 2AY 1494 Albury/Wodonga
 2QN 1521 Deniliquin/Echuca
 3CS 1134 Colac
 3HA 981 Hamilton
 3NE 1566 Wangaratta
 3SH 1332 Swan Hill
 3WM 1089 Horsham
 3YB FM 94.5 Warrnambool
 Gold 1242 Traralgon

Eight stations form the 'Hit Music' network, targeting an 18-39 audience with hot adult contemporary music and syndicated programming:
 Coast FM 95.3 Warrnambool
 Edge FM 102.1 Wangaratta
 Edge FM 102.5 Deniliquin
 Mixx FM 88.9 Hamilton
 Mixx FM 101.3 Horsham
 Mixx FM 106.3 Colac
 Mixx FM 107.7 Swan Hill
 TRFM 99.5 Traralgon

Three stations form the 'Easy Music' network, targeting a 55+ audience:
 3MP 1377 Melbourne
 2UE 954 Sydney (leased from Nine Entertainment)
 4BH 1116 Brisbane (leased from Nine Entertainment)

One station is positioned as 'Classic Hits', targeting a 55+ audience:
 Magic 1278 Melbourne (leased from Nine Entertainment)

Programming 
While programming varies in each market, both AM and FM stations broadcast a variety of locally produced, as well as nationally networked, programmes.

AM stations
 The Morning Rush with Sean Cullen (excludes 2AY Albury and 3NE Wangaratta)
 Country Today
 Mornings with Neil Mitchell (Nine Radio syndication)
 Drive with Tom Elliott (Nine Radio syndication) (2AY & 3SH only)
 Sportsday (Sports Entertainment Network)
 Nights with Denis Walter (Nine Radio syndication) (excludes 3YB & GOLD)
 Australia Overnight with Tony Moclair (Nine Radio syndication) (excludes 3YB & GOLD)
 Reel Adventures (Sports Entertainment Network)
 Off The Bench (Sports Entertainment Network)

FM stations
 The Morning Crew with Gabi and Dan (excludes Mixx FM Colac)
 Fitzy & Wippa (Nova Entertainment syndication) (excludes Edge FM)
 Kate, Tim & Joel (Nova Entertainment syndication)

References

External links 
 Ace Radio Broadcasters
 Melbourne Radio School

 
Radio broadcasting companies of Australia
1984 establishments in Australia